Bhubaneswar Golf Club is a nine-hole golf course is situated in the Infocity area of Bhubaneswar, Odisha. There is a plan to develop the golf course into an 18-hole golf course.

References

External links
Official website

Golf clubs and courses in India
Sports venues in Bhubaneswar
Year of establishment missing